The King's Command (also known as L'Ordre du Roi, or Les Élèves de Dupré) is a ballet in 4 Acts-6 Scenes, with choreography by Marius Petipa and music composed and adapted by Albert Vizentini in a pastiche of airs taken from various works by Johann Strauss II, Léo Delibes, Daniel Auber, Jules Massenet, and Anton Rubinstein.

The work was first presented by the Imperial Ballet on February 14/26 (Julian/Gregorian calendar dates), 1886 at the Imperial Bolshoi Kamenny Theatre in St. Petersburg, Russia, with Virginia Zucchi (as Pepita), Pavel Gerdt (as Pepito), Enrico Cecchetti (as Dupré), and Lev Ivanov (as Milon) in the leading roles. This was the last ballet to be given at the St. Petersburg Imperial Bolshoi Kamenny Theatre before it was demolished in 1886.

Revivals
Revival by Marius Petipa for the Imperial Ballet, first presented on November 30/December 12, 1887 at the Imperial Mariinsky Theatre in St. Petersburg, Russia. Principal Dancers:  Virginia Zucchi (as Pepita), Pavel Gerdt (as Pepito), and Enrico Cecchetti (as Dupré).
Revival by Marius Petipa for the Imperial Ballet in an abridgement in 2 Acts under the title Les Élèves de Dupré (The Pupils of Dupré), with Riccardo Drigo revising Albert Vizentini's score. First presented on February 14/26, 1900 for the Imperial Court at the Theatre of the Hermitage in St. Petersburg, Russia. For this revival many of the character's names were changed, including the principal roles of Pepita and Pepito to Violette and Vestris. Principal Dancers:  Olga Preobrajenskaya (as Violette/Pepita), Nikolai Legat (as Vestris/Pepito), Alexander Shiraev (as Dupré), Pavel Gerdt (as Louis XIV), Pierina Legnani (as Camargo), and Lev Ivanov (as the Count of Montignac).

Notes

Gallery 

Ballets by Marius Petipa
Ballets by Albert Vinzentini
1886 ballet premieres
Ballets premiered at the Bolshoi Theatre, Saint Petersburg